Double Branches is an unincorporated community in Lincoln County, in the U.S. state of Georgia.

History
A post office called Double Branches was established in 1823, and remained in operation until 1926. The community's name is locational, after two streams near the original town site.

References

Unincorporated communities in Lincoln County, Georgia
Unincorporated communities in Georgia (U.S. state)